William Jewell Wallace (June 16, 1907 – April 7, 1999) was an American football player and coach. He served as the head football coach at the University of Houston in its first two football seasons, 1946 and 1947, guiding the Cougars to a 7–14 record. Wallace was a 1934 graduate of Texas Christian University. He began his coaching career at the high school ranks and coached at El Paso Bowie, El Paso, Greenville, San Angelo and Thomas Jefferson High School in San Antonio, Texas.

Wallace died on April 7, 1999, in Fort Collins, Colorado.

Head coaching record

College

Further reading

References

1907 births
1999 deaths
Houston Cougars football coaches
TCU Horned Frogs football coaches
TCU Horned Frogs football players
High school football coaches in Texas
People from Carrollton, Missouri